Mavie Österreicher (born 5 April 2002) is an Austrian tennis player.

Österreicher has a career high ITF junior combined ranking of 194 achieved on 8 July 2019.

Österreicher made her WTA main draw debut at the 2018 Upper Austria Ladies Linz in the doubles draw partnering Nadja Ramskogler.

ITF Finals

Doubles: 1 (final)

ITF junior finals

Singles (4–4)

Doubles (1–5)

References

External links

2002 births
Living people
Austrian female tennis players